Sumaya Dalmar, also known as Sumaya YSL, was a Somali-Canadian transgender activist and model. Sumaya was one of the earliest Somalis to come out as transgender and LGBT as a whole.

Biography
Dalmar was born in Somalia and left during the outbreak of the Somali Civil War at the age of three. Dalmar's biological parents disowned her when she came out as trans to them in 2011. The Toronto-based Muslim died in mysterious circumstances on 22 February 2015 at the age of 26. It was an event that was compared to other acts of violence against trans women of colour, especially during the early months of 2015 when such incidents were reportedly occurring at a particularly high rate, but police have since discounted the occurrence of a homicide.

Later life
In 2013, she was the primary actor for a play and documentary that attempted to intersect the relationship between the Somali ethnicity, religiosity, and its correlation to masculinity during a project called "An Intimate Portrait of Somalian Trans-Woman" by Abdi Osman. By 2014, she was the subject of an art exhibition and had become qualified as a speech therapist. Dalmar, who had the middle name Dasia, also featured in other ventures, such as scheduling to begin employment at an LGBT community center called The 519. One commentator praised the degree of visibility she has given the trans community. In 2018 friends and community members established in recognition of her life's work the Sumaya Dalmar Award for trans students of colour.

References

1988 births
2015 deaths
Canadian Muslims
Black Canadian LGBT people
Somalian LGBT people
Somalian emigrants to Canada
Transgender female models
Transgender rights activists
Transgender Muslims
Black Canadian activists